Phillip John Tracey (born 1963 or 1964) is a quadriplegic Australian Paralympic swimmer.  At the 1984 New York/Stoke Mandeville Paralympics, he won a bronze medal in the Men's 100 m Freestyle 1A event. He won three silver medals at the 1988 Seoul Games in the Men's 100 m Freestyle 1A, Men's 25 m Backstroke 1A and Men's 50 m Freestyle 1A events. He competed in swimming without winning a medal at the 1992 Barcelona Paralympics. He was from Murrumbeena, Victoria and 34 at the time of the Games.

In 2002, Tracey in a specially designed wheelchair for paragliding had a paraglider flight Mystic near Bright, Victoria. This was a first paraglider flight for a quadriplegic. At the time, Tracey was Chairman of Wheelchair Sports Victoria.

References

External links
 

1960s births
Living people
Place of birth missing (living people)
Male Paralympic swimmers of Australia
Paralympic silver medalists for Australia
Paralympic bronze medalists for Australia
Paralympic medalists in swimming
Swimmers at the 1984 Summer Paralympics
Swimmers at the 1988 Summer Paralympics
Swimmers at the 1992 Summer Paralympics
Medalists at the 1984 Summer Paralympics
Medalists at the 1988 Summer Paralympics
Wheelchair category Paralympic competitors
Swimmers from Melbourne
Australian male freestyle swimmers
Australian male backstroke swimmers
S3-classified Paralympic swimmers
20th-century Australian people
People from Murrumbeena, Victoria
Sportsmen from Victoria (Australia)